The 1932–33 season was Galatasaray SK's 29th in existence and the club's 21st consecutive season in the Istanbul Football League.

Squad statistics

Squad changes for the 1932–33 season

In:

Out:

Competitions

Istanbul Football League

Standings

Matches
Kick-off listed in local time (EEST)

İstanbul Shield
Kick-off listed in local time (EEST)

Friendly Matches

References
 Atabeyoğlu, Cem. 1453-1991 Türk Spor Tarihi Ansiklopedisi. page(127).(1991) An Grafik Basın Sanayi ve Ticaret AŞ
 Tekil, Süleyman. Dünden bugüne Galatasaray, (1983), page(63-64, 140, 179). Arset Matbaacılık Kol.Şti.
 Futbol vol.2. Galatasaray. Page: 587. Tercüman Spor Ansiklopedisi. (1981)Tercüman Gazetecilik ve Matbaacılık AŞ.

External links
 Galatasaray Sports Club Official Website 
 Turkish Football Federation - Galatasaray A.Ş. 
 uefa.com - Galatasaray AŞ

Galatasaray S.K. (football) seasons
Turkish football clubs 1932–33 season
1930s in Istanbul